Beraunite is an iron phosphate mineral. It was first described by August Breithaupt for an occurrence in Beraun currently in the Czech Republic. Beraunite occurs as a secondary mineral in iron ore deposits, and as an alteration product of primary phosphate minerals in granite pegmatites.

Beraunite crystallizes in the monoclinic crystal system with point group 2/m. Beraunite’s formula is Fe2+ Fe3+5(OH)5(PO4)4·4H2O. Aluminium and zinc may substitute in the structure.

Occurrence

Beraunite occurs as a secondary mineral in iron ore deposits and as an alteration product of primary phosphates minerals in granite pegmatites. It is found as an alteration product of triphylite at the Big Chief and Hesnard mines, Keystone, Pennington County, South Dakota, New Hampshire. Also, it is found in Arkansas, New Jersey and Pennsylvania in the United States. In addition to those places, it is found in Ireland, Germany, and the Czech Republic.

Structure
It occurs as fibrous greenish-black to brown nodules. The chemical analysis of beraunite often show small and irrational amounts of ferrous iron. The chain segments in Beraunite are one and two octahedral in length. Beraunite has two different types which are Zn-rich and Al-rich Beraunites, those two types have variations in data between those taken by Krsano in the X-ray powder diffraction experiment and those in the literature.
Phosphate minerals have special characteristics about their chemical composition. The polyatomic complex of iron-oxygen octahedral face is sharing triplets corner to four other octahedral in the arrangement of atoms of the basic iron phosphates like dufrenite, rockbridgeite, and Beraunite. This complex is linked together by the phosphate tetrahedra.

References

Further reading
Alan F.Krivis and John M.Rabb. (1969). Cuprous Complexes Formed with Isonicotinic Hydrazide. American Association for the Advancement of Science. 164, 1064-1065.
Barron and Munn.(1967). The crystal structure of beraunite. Acta Crystallographica.22,173-181.
Blanchard and Denahan.(1968). Cacoxenite and Beraunite From Florida. American Mineralogist. 53,2099-2100.
Clifford Frondel. (1949). The dufrenite problem, American Mineralogist,34, 513-540.
Johan P.R.DE. Villiers.(1975). The Crystal Structure of Beraunite with Reference to Its Solid- Solution Behavior. American Mineralogist, 60,1103.  
Krsano.(2006). Mineralogy of phosphate accumulations in the Huber stock. Czech Geological Society. 51, 1-2
Nriagu and Moore.(1984).Phosphate Minerals.16.
Paul B.Moore.(1969).Basic Ferric Phosphates: A Crystallochemical Principle. Science. American Association for the Advancement of Science. 164, 1063-1064.

External links

Iron(II,III) minerals
Phosphate minerals
Monoclinic minerals
Minerals in space group 15